Nick Wechsler (born 1978) is an American actor.

Nick Wechsler may also refer to:

Nick Wechsler (film producer) (born 1949), American film producer